The men's tournament of Water polo at the 2016 Summer Olympics at Rio de Janeiro, Brazil, began on 6 August and ended on 20 August 2016. Games were held at the Maria Lenk Aquatics Centre and the Olympic Aquatics Stadium.

Serbia won the gold medal by defeating Croatia in the final. Bronze was won by Italy after beating Montenegro. After the Rio Olympics, Serbia national team held Olympic Games, World Championship, European Championship, World Cup and World League titles simultaneously.

Competition schedule

Qualification

Draw
The draw was held on 10 April 2016.

Teams from twelve nations compete in the tournament and were seeded into two groups for the preliminary round. The top four teams advance to the quarterfinals.

Seeding
The seeding was announced on 10 April 2016.

Referees
The following referees were selected for the tournament.

 German Moller
 Daniel Flahive
 Mark  Koganov
 Fabio Toffoli
 Marie-Claude Deslières
 Ni Shi Wei
 Nenad Peris
 Hatem Gaber
 Benjamin Mercier
 Georgios Stavridis
 Péter Molnár
 Masoud Rezvani
 Filippo Gomez
 Tadao Tahara
 Stanko Ivanovski
 Diana Dutilh-Dumas
 Radosław Koryzna
 Adrian Alexandrescu
 Sergey Naumov
 Vojin Putniković
 Boris Margeta
 Dion Willis
 Francesc Buch
 Joseph Peila

Group stage

Group A

Group B

Knockout stage

Bracket

5th place bracket

Quarter-finals

5–8th place semifinals

Semi-finals

Seventh place game

Fifth place game

Bronze medal game

Gold medal game

Final ranking

Medalists

Statistics

Multi-time Olympians

Five-time Olympian(s): 2 players
 : Stefano Tempesti (GK)
 : Tony Azevedo

Four-time Olympian(s): 7 players
 : Damir Burić, Xavier García
 : Christos Afroudakis
 : Pietro Figlioli
 : Predrag Jokić
 : Guillermo Molina
 : Jesse Smith

Multiple medalists

Three-time Olympic medalist(s): 5 players
 : Filip Filipović, Živko Gocić, Slobodan Nikić, Duško Pijetlović, Andrija Prlainović

Leading goalscorers

Source: Official Results Book (page 100)

Leading goalkeepers

Source: Official Results Book (page 102)

Leading sprinters

Source: Official Results Book (page 99)

Awards
The men's all-star team was announced on 20 August 2016.

Most Valuable Player
  Filip Filipović (left-handed, 19 goals)

Media All-Star Team
 Goalkeeper
  Marko Bijač (57 saves)
 Field players
  Darko Brguljan (15 goals)
  Filip Filipović (left-handed, 19 goals)
  Guillermo Molina (19 goals, 1 sprints won)
  Slobodan Nikić (centre forward, 10 goals)
  Christian Presciutti (14 goals)
  Sandro Sukno (17 goals, 3 sprints won)

See also
 Water polo at the 2016 Summer Olympics – Women's tournament

References

Sources
 PDF documents in the Olympic World Library:
 Official Results Book – 2016 Olympic Games – Water Polo (archive)
 Water polo on the Olympedia website
 Water polo at the 2016 Summer Olympics (men's tournament)
 Water polo on the Sports Reference website
 Water polo at the 2016 Summer Games (men's tournament) (archived)

Men's tournament
Men's events at the 2016 Summer Olympics